The homestead exemption is a legal regime to protect the value of the homes of residents from property taxes, creditors, and circumstances that arise from the death of the homeowner's spouse.

Such laws are found in the statutes or the constitution of many of the states in the United States. The homestead exemption in some states of the South has its legal origins in the exemption laws of the Spanish Empire. In other states, they were enacted in response to the effects of 19th-century economy.

Description
Homestead exemption laws typically have four primary features:
 Preventing the forced sale of a home to meet the demands of creditors, usually except mortgages, mechanics liens, or sales to pay property taxes
 Providing the surviving spouse with shelter
 Providing an exemption from property taxes on a home
 Allowing a tax-exempt homeowner to vote on property tax increases to homeowners over the threshold, by bond or millage requests

For the purposes of statutes, a homestead is the one primary residence of a person, and no other exemption can be claimed on any other property anywhere, even outside the boundaries of the jurisdiction in which the exemption is claimed.

In some states, homestead protection is automatic. In many states, however, homeowners receive the protections of the law only if they file a claim for homestead exemption with the state. Furthermore, the protection can be lost if the homeowner abandons the protected property by taking up primary residence elsewhere.

Immunity from forced sale
Different jurisdictions provide different degrees of protection under homestead exemption laws. Some protect only property up to a certain value, and others have acreage limitations. If a homestead exceeds the limits, creditors may still force the sale, but the homesteader may keep a certain amount of the proceeds of the sale.

California protects up to $75,000 for single people, $100,000 for married couples, and $175,000 for people over 65 or legally disabled. In California, SB 308 was introduced in early 2015. It initially proposed a $700,000 homestead exemption, regardless of age or marital status. It has recently been amended down to $300,000.

Texas, Florida, Iowa, South Dakota, Kansas, and Oklahoma have some of the broadest homestead protections in the United States in terms of the value of property that can be protected.

The rural acre allotment is doubled for a family:  can be shielded from creditors in Texas for a rural homestead.

Most homestead exemptions cover the land including fixtures and improvements to it, such as buildings, timber, and landscaping.

Nevada exempts $605,000 in equity from sale on execution, but for homesteads for which allodial title has been established and not relinquished, the exemption extends to all equity in the homestead.

New Mexico has a $60,000 exemption. Alaska has a $54,000 exemption.

Colorado has a $75,000 exemption, or $105,000 for people who are over 60 or disabled.

In most states, the real dollar value of "protection" provided by the laws has diminished, as exemption dollar amounts are seldom adjusted for inflation. The protective intent of such laws, with some notable exceptions like those stated above, has been eroded in most states.

Property tax exemption
A homestead exemption is most often on only a fixed monetary amount, such as the first $50,000 of the assessed value. The remainder is taxed at the normal rate. A home valued at $150,000 would then be taxed on only $100,000 and a home valued at $75,000 would then be taxed on only $25,000.

The exemption is generally intended to turn the property tax into a progressive tax. In some places, the exemption is paid for with a local or state (or equivalent unit) sales tax.

Examples
California exempts the first $7,000 of residential homestead from property taxes.
Colorado allows a 50% deduction for up to the first $200,000 (equivalent to a $100,000 exemption if the property is valued at $200,000 or above) for seniors (over age 65) who have lived in their property for ten consecutive years.
Georgia allows a 1% HEST only in a few counties.
Florida's homestead exemption allows an exemption of 160 acres outside of a municipality and one-half an acre inside a municipality.
Kentucky, for 2019 and 2020, the exemption has been set at $39,300. Once it is approved, homeowners who are 65 or older do not need to reapply for the homestead exemption each year.
Louisiana exempts the first $7,500 of residential homestead from local property taxes.
Michigan exempts the homeowner from paying the operating millage of local school districts.
Mississippi exemption from all ad valorem taxes assessed to property; this is limited to the first $7,500 of the assessed value or $300 of the actual exempted tax dollars.
New York's School Tax Relief (STAR) program exempts the first $30,000 of a primary home's assessed value from school district taxes; the exemption is limited to owners with incomes under $500,000. Additional exemptions are available for people over 65 with a limited income. The STAR program applies only to school taxes; no homestead exemption exists for taxes levied by other municipal entities.  New York prevents a New York resident claiming this exemption if the New York resident owns property in another state and claims a similar exemption in that other state.
Oklahoma allows a $1000 deduction of the assessed valuation, about $75 to $125 of savings per year, if owners file for homestead exemption with the local county clerk.
Rhode Island exempts the first 20% of the home value from property taxes.
Texas allows a deduction, with additional exemptions available for county taxes, people over 65 and people who are disabled.  It also requires school districts to offer a $25,000 exemption (but not other taxing districts, such as cities and counties).  Texas further limits the assessment increase on a homestead to 10% of the prior year's value.

Notes

References
Combs, Susan. Texas Property Tax Code 2006 Edition Retrieved 22 May 2007.

External links
 Homestead exemption rules in various states at Law Check
 

Taxation in the United States
Legal terminology
Real property law in the United States